Einar Økland (born 17 January 1940) is a Norwegian poet, playwright, essayist and children's writer.

He was born in Sveio, and educated psychologist.

He made his literary debut in 1963, with the poetry collection Ein gul dag. He was awarded the Melsom Prize 1991 for Når ikkje anna er sagt, and the Dobloug Prize in 2000.

Awards 
Norwegian Critics Prize for Literature 1978
Aschehoug Prize 1988
Melsom Prize 1992
Nynorsk Literature Prize 1993
Dobloug Prize 2000
Gyldendal Prize 2007
Språkprisen 2015
Brage Prize Honorary Award 2015

References

1940 births
Living people
Norwegian essayists
20th-century Norwegian poets
Norwegian male poets
Norwegian children's writers
Dobloug Prize winners
Nynorsk-language writers
Male essayists
20th-century essayists
20th-century Norwegian male writers
People from Sveio